The University of Argentine Social Museum (UMSA)  is a university in Argentina. It was founded on November 5, 1956, in the city of Buenos Aires and consists of five departments: 
Facultad de Ciencias Jurídicas y Sociales (law)
Facultad de Ciencias Humanas (social sciences)
Facultad de Artes (Art)
Facultad de Lenguas Modernas (modern language)
Facultad de Ciencias Económicas (economics)

See also

 Argentine university reform of 1918
 List of Argentine universities
 Science and technology in Argentina

References

External links
Argentine government website for international students 
 Portal del Instituto de Orientación Vocacional y Profesional de la Universidad del Museo Social Argentino

1956 establishments in Argentina
Education in Buenos Aires
Educational institutions established in 1956
Universities in Buenos Aires Province